Billy Ray Smith Sr. (January 27, 1935 – March 21, 2001) was a National Football League defensive lineman (1957–1970).  He was born in Augusta, Arkansas.

College career
After graduating from Augusta High School, Arkansas head coach Bowden Wyatt offered Smith a football scholarship, and in 1953, he enrolled at the University of Arkansas. In 1954, Smith and the Razorbacks won the Southwest Conference Championship with only twenty-five players. They became known as the "25 Little Pigs", making their accomplishment all the more amazing. Wyatt would leave Arkansas after the 1954 season to coach his alma mater Tennessee, and was replaced by Jack Mitchell. In 1956, Smith was named 1st Team All-Southwest Conference. An additional highlight of Smith's time at Arkansas, was the fact that the Razorbacks defeated the Texas Longhorns three years in a row, from 1954 to 1956. 

Smith was inducted into the Arkansas Sports Hall of Fame in 1976, and enshrined into the University of Arkansas' Hall of Honor in 1994. He was named to the All-Decade Team of the 1950s, and the Arkansas All-Century Team in 1994. In 1999, Sports Illustrated named him as one of the "Fifty Greatest Sports Figures from Arkansas".

NFL career

Smith began his NFL career in 1957, as the third round draft pick for the Los Angeles Rams. He was traded to the Steelers in 1958 and played for Pittsburgh until 1960. In 1961, he was traded to the Baltimore Colts.

It was in Baltimore that he would make his mark on professional football. Nicknamed "The Rabbit" by his teammates, Smith became a mainstay and captain of a defensive line, which took the Colts to Super Bowl III and Super Bowl V during his career. His game motto was simple: "We always play for a shutout. Nothing fancy, nothing sensational. Just a shutout." Smith retired from professional football in 1971 after the Colts defeated the Dallas Cowboys in Super Bowl V, ending his 13-year career.

Professional career

After retiring from the NFL, Smith became an investment banker. He was the father of 4 children. His son, Billy Ray Smith, Jr. was an NFL linebacker, playing ten years with the San Diego Chargers. He was also a two-time All-American with the University of Arkansas.

Smith died from cancer on March 23, 2001.

References 

1935 births
2001 deaths
American football defensive linemen
Arkansas Razorbacks football players
Baltimore Colts players
Pittsburgh Steelers players
Los Angeles Rams players
Players of American football from Arkansas
People from Augusta, Arkansas